The Boston Modern Orchestra Project (BMOP) is a professional orchestra in Boston, Massachusetts, United States.

Founded in 1996 by artistic director Gil Rose, its mission is to explore the connections between contemporary music and contemporary society by reuniting composers and audiences in a shared concert experience. In its first twelve seasons, BMOP performed over 80 concerts of contemporary orchestral music, commissioned more than 20 works and presented over 70 world premieres, released 20 CDs, produced the inaugural Ditson Festival of Contemporary Music with the Institute of Contemporary Art, Boston, and collaborated to produce performances of contemporary operas (including the Opera Unlimited festival of contemporary chamber opera). Now entering its 20th season, it has released nearly 50 CDs in total. BMOP performs regularly at Boston's Jordan Hall, and has performed in major venues on both the East and West Coasts of the United States. BMOP has appeared at Tanglewood, the Festival of New American Music in Sacramento, California, and Pittsburgh's "Music on the Edge" festival.

The orchestra has won the ASCAP Award for Adventurous Programming of Orchestral Music and recipient of the John S. Edwards Award for Strongest Commitment to New American Music. In 2015 it was named Musical America's 2016 Ensemble of the Year, the first ever symphony orchestra to receive the award.

In 2008, BMOP launched its record label, BMOP/sound, with John Harbison's ballet "Ulysses". Its composer-centric releases focus on orchestral works that are otherwise unavailable in recorded form. Its five inaugural releases appeared on the "Best of 2008" lists of The New York Times, The Boston Globe, National Public Radio, Time Out New York, Down Beat magazine, and American Record Guide. BMOP/sound has received two Grammy award nominations: in 2009 for its recording of Charles Fussell's Wilde symphony for baritone and orchestra (Sanford Sylvan Best Classical Vocal Performance), and in 2010 for its recording of Derek Bermel's "Voices" for solo clarinet and orchestra (Best Instrumental Soloist Performance with Orchestra). The New York Times proclaimed, "BMOP/sound is an example of everything done right." 

BMOP has hosted a Composer in Residence each season since 2000. In recognition of the importance of this position, Meet the Composer and the League of American Orchestras awarded BMOP one of six three-year Music Alive grants for a collaboration with composer Lisa Bielawa.

The New York Times said in 2000: "Mr. Rose and his team filled the music with rich, decisive ensemble colors and magnificent solos. These musicians were rapturous - superb instrumentalists at work and play." Composer John Harbison has said that "No other city has anything resembling BMOP — with that level of activity, with that sustained productivity ... There's really been no new-music organization with a wider range of inclusion."

References

External links
Boston Modern Orchestra Project site
Gil Rose site
Art of the States: Boston Modern Orchestra Project six works performed by the orchestra
A Bold Declaration: experiencing BMOP's modern music 2002 ArtsEditor.com feature article

Musical groups from Boston
Musical groups established in 1996
Contemporary classical music ensembles
Arts organizations established in 1996
Orchestras based in Massachusetts